The fifth and final season of The New Adventures of Old Christine was renewed on April 22, 2009 and announcing in May to be the final season that premiered on CBS on Wednesday nights at 8:00 PM on September 23, 2009 and concluded on May 12, 2010. It consisted of 21 episodes.

In this season, following Barb's arrest she is rescued by Christine, Matthew and new boyfriend Dave. While Richard tries to win New Christine back, he temporarily moves into a new apartment with Matthew. Christine begins going to therapy, but she is attracted to her therapist, Max. They eventually abandon Christine's therapy and strike up a relationship instead. New Christine announces that she is pregnant, causing Richard to rekindle his relationship with her and New Christine eventually gives birth to a baby girl. Meanwhile, Barb becomes engaged to a reluctant Dave. At the conclusion of the season, Christine also becomes engaged to Max, but she feels intimidated by his very educated friends so she decides to return to college. On May 18, 2010, CBS announced that the series would not be brought back for a 6th season.

This season earned two Emmy Award nominations: one for Outstanding Lead Actress in a Comedy Series for Louis-Dreyfus, and one for Outstanding Art Direction for a Multi-Camera Series.

Cancellation
The early ratings for the fifth season were lower than previous seasons, but the 14th episode of the season reached 8.3 million viewers, the highest viewership the show had received in the Wednesday night timeslot. While the future of the show was uncertain at CBS, ABC had shown interest in the series on several occasions, and on May 3, 2010, Deadline Hollywood reported that ABC was in negotiations with Warner Bros. to pick up Old Christine, should CBS cancel it. On May 18, 2010, CBS canceled Old Christine. There was speculation that ABC would pick up the show, but the negotiations between Warner Brothers and ABC were slow. In June 2010, Deadline Hollywood reported that ABC were no longer interested in picking up the show. Upon CBS cancelling the show, creator Kari Lizer slammed the network and suggested the decision to cancel the show was sexist.

Cast and characters

Main
 Julia Louis-Dreyfus as "Old" Christine Campbell
 Clark Gregg as Richard Campbell
 Hamish Linklater as Matthew Kimble
 Trevor Gagnon as Ritchie Campbell
 Emily Rutherfurd as "New" Christine Hunter
 Tricia O'Kelley and Alex Kapp Horner as Marly Ehrhardt and Lindsay (a.k.a. "The Meanie Moms")
 Wanda Sykes as Barbara 'Barb' Baran

Recurring
 Eric McCormack as Dr. Max Kershaw
 Lily Goff as Ashley Ehrhardt
 Marissa Blanchard as Kelsey

Guest stars
 James Lesure as Dave
 Dave Florek as The Douch
 Jeanette O'Connor as Candy
 Wayne Nickel as Larry
 Christopher Gartin as Glenn
 Corbin Bernsen as Howard
 Marion Ross as Agnes
 Stefanie Scott as Britney Burke
 Mary Beth McDonough as Mrs. Wilhoite
 Rachel G. Fox as Gretchen
 Dave Foley as Tom
 Jennifer Grey as Tracy
 Michaela Watkins as Lucy
 Nancy Lenehan as Principal Marcie Nunley
 Amy Sedaris as Frances Stein
 Molly Shannon as Jeannie
 Katie Walder as Hannah
 Adrienne Barbeau as herself
 Blair Underwood as Daniel Harris
 Clea Lewis as Emily
 Tim Meadows as Dr. Volk
 Ed Begley, Jr. as Pastor Ed
 Ashley Williams as Amy
 Jim Meskimen as Bernie
 Scott Bakula as 'Papa' Jeff Hunter
 Joel McKinnon Miller as Officer Dutton
 Jeff Witzke as Frank
 Julia Lehman as Heidi
 Josh Randall as Officer Johnson
 Beth Littleford as Tony Kershaw

Episodes

References

2009 American television seasons
2010 American television seasons